USS Mulberry (AN-27/YN-22) was an  built for the United States Navy during World War II. She saw service in that conflict and the Korean War, earning one battle star for service in the latter conflict. She was decommissioned in April 1960 and placed in reserve. In November 1965, she was transferred to the Ecuadorian Navy as BAE Orion (HI-91). She was scrapped in 1980.

Career 
Mulberry (AN 27) originally designated YN 22, was laid down 18 October 1940 by the American Shipbuilding Company, Cleveland, Ohio; launched 26 March 1941; sponsored by Mrs. W. H. Gerhauser; placed in service at Guantanamo Bay, Cuba, in the 10th Naval District; commissioned 19 December 1942 and was reclassified AN 27, effective 20 January 1944.

Following re-designation, Mulberry departed Guantanamo Bay and sailed to Adak, Alaska. Operating from Adak and Kodiak, Alaska, she engaged in net tending, carried cargo, and transported military personnel in Alaskan an Aleutian waters for the next 3 years.

She arrived San Francisco, California, 12 March 1947 for an overhaul, after which she proceeded to Tiburon, California, for training exercises. Assigned to Hawaii net laying ship duty, she engaged in harbor operations at Pearl Harbor from 7 June to January 1948. She resumed operations off the U.S. West Coast for the next 2 years, departing Bremerton, Washington, 8 July 1950 for duty in Japan.

For the next 5 years she engaged in net tending at Sasebo and Yokosuka Harbors. Between 29 May and 1 August 1953, she operated in the Korean ports of Pusan, Cheju Do, Ulsan, Wonsan, and Chinhae, aiding United Nations forces meeting the challenge of Communist aggression,

Mulberry arrived Long Beach, California, 23 December 1955, and continued operations from that port for the next 5 years. She decommissioned 11 April 1960, and was placed in the Pacific Reserve Fleet, berthed at San Diego, California. The Mulberry was transferred on loan to Ecuador in November 1965 under the Military Assistance Program where she served as Orion (HI-91); she was scrapped in 1980.

Honors and awards
Mulberry received one battle star for her U.S. Korean War service.

References
 
 NavSource Online: Service Ship Photo Archive - YN-22 / AN-27 Mulberry

 

Aloe-class net laying ships
Ships built in Cleveland
1941 ships
World War II net laying ships of the United States
Korean War auxiliary ships of the United States
Ships transferred from the United States Navy to the Ecuadorian Navy
Auxiliary ships of the Ecuadorian Navy